"Move on Baby" is a song by Italian group Cappella, released on 10 February 1994 as the fifth single from their second studio album, U Got 2 Know (1994). It is written by Gianfranco Bortolotti, Ricardo Overman, Diego Leoni, Lorenzo Carpella, Alessandro Pasinelli and Bruno Guerrini. Bortolotti produced the song and it achieved great success in many countries, particularly in Finland, Israel, the Netherlands and Switzerland, where it topped the chart. It received gold status in Austria, Belgium, France, Germany and Switzerland.

Critical reception
John Bush from AllMusic viewed "Move on Baby" as a "continent-wide Hi-NRG hit". Larry Flick from Billboard commented, "After several years of building a loyal following of hi-NRG and Euro-pop fans, Italo-house act Capella appears prepped to take on the rest of the club world. "Move On Baby" kicks with a perfect blend of foamy froth and underground depth." He added it as a "cute and catchy song". Taylor Parks from Melody Maker described it as "exotic", "refreshingly un-English" and "glorious". He also noted its "face-punching beats". Andy Beevers from Music Week rated the song five out of five, writing that it "relies heavily on an anthemic synth riff that is very similar to those used on the last two Cappella hits. The cheesy rap and screaming vocals provide the distinguishing features. Zero ponts for originality, but maximum marks for chart potential." James Hamilton from the magazine's RM Dance Update deemed it a "Culture Beat-type typical cheesy Italo pop raver".

Chart performance
"Move on Baby" was very successful on the charts in many countries, peaking at number-one in Finland, the Netherlands and Switzerland. In Europe, it made it to the top 10 also in Austria (number three), Belgium (number three), Germany, Ireland, Italy (number two), Norway, Scotland, Spain, Sweden and the United Kingdom. In the latter, the single peaked at number seven in its first week at the UK Singles Chart, on February 13. But was even more successful on the UK Dance Singles Chart, peaking at number four. On the Eurochart Hot 100, the song entered on 26 February and peaked at the top spot four weeks later. It did also top the European Dance Radio Chart. Additionally, it was a top 20 hit in Denmark and Iceland. Outside Europe, "Move on Baby" peaked at number-one in Israel, number seven on the Billboard Hot Dance Club Play chart in the US, number 24 on the RPM Dance/Urban chart in Canada, and number 58 in Australia. It was awarded with a gold record in Germany, with a sale of 250,000 singles, and also received gold status in Austria, Belgium, France and Switzerland.

Airplay
"Move On Baby" entered the European airplay chart Border Breakers at number 14 on 26 February due to crossover airplay in West Central-, Northwest- and North-Europe, and peaked at number five on 12 March.

Music video
A music video was produced to promote the single, directed by B. Smith/W. Holloway. It received heavy rotation on MTV Europe and was A-listed on Germany's VIVA. The video was later published on YouTube in February 2012, and as of December 2022, it had generated more than 3 million views. B. Smith/W. Holloway also directed the video for the group's 1993 hit, "U Got 2 Let the Music".

Impact and legacy
British DJ duo Sharp Boyz picked the Armand Van Helden remix of "Move on Baby" as one of their favourites in 1996. George Mitchell said, "This rates as one of his best. He's a big inspiration to us. he came with a hard sound, heartbeat kick drum, and took on projects everyone else would say no to and transformed them, as he did with this remix."

Track listings

Official mixes and remixes

 “Move on Baby” (Album Version) — 4:46
 “Move on Baby” (Armand Van Helden Remix) — 8:40
 “Move on Baby” (Armand Van Helden Remix Edit) — 3:24
 “Move on Baby” (Definitive Edit) — 3:38
 “Move on Baby” (DJ Pierre Trance Mix) — 8:20
 “Move on Baby” (Extended Mix) — 5:44
 “Move on Baby” (Extended Remix Vocal) — 5:19
 “Move on Baby” (F-Mix) — 5:25 
 “Move on Baby” (House Mix) — 5:29
 “Move on Baby” (KCD – Radio Edit)(Mars Plastic Mix) — 3:46
 “Move on Baby” (KM 1972 Mix) — 6:00
 “Move on Baby” (Mars Plastic Mix) — 5:28

 “Move on Baby” (Mars Plastic Edit) — 3:25
 “Move on Baby” (Mike Candys Extended Remix) — 4:00
 “Move on Baby” (Mike Candys Remix Edit) — 3:03
 “Move on Baby” (Mike Candys VIP Remix) — 3:50
 “Move on Baby” (Original Mix) — 5:14
 “Move on Baby” (Overture & R.A.F. Zone Mix) — 11:37
 “Move on Baby” (Plus Staples Mix) — 6:10
 “Move on Baby” (Ralf & Professor Mix) — 6:59
 “Move on Baby” (Razor Mix) — 5:28
 “Move on Baby” (Razor Edit) — 3:38
 “Move on Baby” (Sound Of Love Mix) — 6:35
 “Move on Baby” (Tribalism Mix) — 6:30

Charts and certifications

Weekly charts

Year-end charts

Certifications

References

1994 singles
Cappella (band) songs
Electronic songs
European Hot 100 Singles number-one singles
Number-one singles in Finland
Number-one singles in Israel
Dutch Top 40 number-one singles
Number-one singles in Switzerland
Songs written by Gianfranco Bortolotti
1994 songs